is a passenger railway station in the city of Kashiwa, Chiba, Japan, operated by East Japan Railway Company (JR East).

Lines

Station layout
The station is an elevated station with a single island platform serving two tracks. The station is staffed.

Platforms

History
Minami-Kashiwa Station was opened on October 1, 1953 as a station on the Japan National Railways (JNR). A new elevated station building was completed in December 1971. Minami-Kashiwa Station was absorbed into the JR East network upon the privatization of the JNR on April 1, 1987.

Passenger statistics
In fiscal 2019, the station was used by an average of 32,930 passengers daily.

Surrounding area
 
 Kashiwa Municipal Yutaka Elementary School
 Nagareyama Municipal Mukaikogane Elementary School

See also
 List of railway stations in Japan

References

External links

   JR East Station information 

Railway stations in Chiba Prefecture
Railway stations in Japan opened in 1953
Jōban Line
Kashiwa